List of the business improvement districts in London, England. Kingston First was the first such district in the United Kingdom.

References

 
Business improvement districts